Mundus inversus, Latin for "world upside-down," is a literary topos in which the natural order of things is overturned and social hierarchies are reversed. More generally, it is a symbolic inversion of any sort.

Although the words are ancient, the term mundus inversus has been common in English only since the 1960s.

In European Literature and the Latin Middle Ages, Ernst Robert Curtius first identified the topos, illustrating it with one of the Carmina Burana ("Florebat olim studium"), about which he comments (p. 94):

Curtius concludes with a formula for creating the mundus inversus (p. 96): "Out of stringing together impossibilia grows a topos: 'the world upsidedown.'"

In Renaissance-era French culture
In The World Upside Down in 16th-Century French Literature and Visual Culture, Vincent Robert-Nícoud introduces the mundus inversus by writing (p. 1):

In anthropology
In the 1978 book The Reversible World: Symbolic Inversion in Art and Society (Symbol, Myth, and Ritual), folklorist Barbara Babcock defines mundus inversus as (p. 14):

See also
 Pittura infamante, a Renaissance-era "defaming portrait" that often depicts mundus inversus motifs

References

Rhetoric
Folklore studies